BBC Knowledge was a television channel available in various countries outside the United Kingdom, showcasing factual and non-fiction entertainment programming from the BBC and independent UK production houses. Wholly owned by BBC Studios, it is not related to the previous channel known as BBC Knowledge, an early digital channel available within the UK, which closed down in 2002 in favour of BBC Four and CBeebies.

At one time, the channel provided five key programming strands enabling simple appointment viewing: 
 The World delved and explored new cultures around the world
 Science & Technology explored new frontiers, from space to motoring
 People explored aspects of the human body and mind
 The Past brought historical events, places and people back to life
 Business offered invaluable advice to help stay on top of today's challenging business world.

On 15 November 2009, BBC Knowledge in Australia changed their channel location from Channel 619 to Channel 612.

In 2014 it was announced that BBC Studios would rollout a new channel, BBC Earth, which would replace BBC Knowledge in most locations, except for where it was successful. Poland was the first location to launch the new brand on 1 February 2015.

Launch and closure dates

BBC Knowledge was first launched in Singapore on mio TV (Now in Singtel TV) in July 2007. It has been available on now TV in Hong Kong since October 2007 and on the Cyfrowy Polsat digital satellite platform in Poland from December 2007 (Cyfra Plus in Poland plans its launch only on 1 Feb 2011 due to prior exclusive BBC deals with Polsat).  BBC Knowledge launched in Indonesia on Indovision in April 2008, and in South Africa on DStv in September 2008. It has since also launched in the Scandinavian countries in November 2008 when it replaced BBC Prime on Canal Digital and several cable systems.  It was launched in Australia on Foxtel and Optus Television on 1 November 2008; in South Korea on CJ HelloVision on 1 December 2008 and on GS Gangnam Broadcasting on 26 May 2009.

In June 2009, citing the lack of viewership, the BBC terminated its carriage deal with SingTel's mio TV to air BBC Knowledge, (along with CBeebies and BBC Lifestyle), and entered into an agreement with StarHub TV to carry the channels from 1 August 2009, and in Romania on 31 December 2010.

BBC Knowledge was launched on Cable TV Hong Kong on 29 October 2009.

The channel was launched in New Zealand in March 2011 replacing the Documentary Channel following that channel's sale to BBC Studios.

From 1 March 2011 the channel is broadcast in Italy too. It's visible, in standard definition until 1 March 2016.

On 13 August 2013 the channel launched on Digiturk in Turkey.

On 1 February 2015, BBC Knowledge launched on Australian IPTV service Fetch TV.

The New Zealand BBC Knowledge channel was replaced by a localized version of BBC Earth on 22 October 2018. 

The final BBC Knowledge channel in Australia was relaunched as a localized version of BBC Earth on 10 October 2019, therefore ending the use of the BBC Knowledge brand after 15 years.

Asia 
 Bang Goes The Theory
 Deadly 60
 Engineering Giants
 Frozen Planet
 Gordon Behind Bars
 Junior Doctors: Your Life in Their Hands
 Kevin McCloud's Grand Tour
 Kingdom of Plants
 Naomi's Nightmares of Nature
 Planet Earth
 Secret Millionaire USA
 Top Gear
 Ultimate Sports Day

Australia 

 An Idiot Abroad
 Dragons' Den
 Extraordinary Women
 Fishing Impossible
 Human Universe
 Islands of Britain
 Jeremy Clarkson's Extreme Machines
 Never Mind the Buzzcocks
 Road Warriors: The Extra Mile
 Ross Kemp: Extreme World
 School of Saatchi
 The Moaning of Life
 The World's...and Me
 Top Gear
 Top Gear: Extra Gear
 Top Gear (USA)
 Trawlermen
 Where the Wild Men Are
 Wonders of the Universe

See also
BBC World News
BBC Lifestyle
BBC Entertainment
CBeebies
BBC HD
BBC Four
BBC Earth

References

External links
 Official website
 BBC News Online: BBC to launch global TV channels
 Variety: BBC Worldwide bows new channels

International BBC television channels
Television channels and stations established in 2007
Television channels and stations disestablished in 2019
BBC Worldwide